"Arḍ ul-Furātayn", also known as the "Land of The Two Rivers" or "Ardulfurataini", was the national anthem of Iraq from 1981 to 2003, during the Ba'athist regime of Saddam Hussein.

History

The lyrics make mention of important people in Iraqi history, such as Saladin, Harun al-Rashid, and al-Muthanna ibn Haritha, with the last verse extolling Ba'athism.

In shortened performances, the chorus was played twice, preceded by an instrumental introduction. Other abridged performances had the chorus twice, then the first verse once, concluding with the chorus performed twice. In full performances, the chorus was sung first twice, then each verse once with the chorus repeated twice in between, then the chorus sung again twice at the end.

After the ousting of Saddam Hussein's Ba'athist regime in 2003, the former national anthem of Iraq from the late 1950s and early 1960s, "Mawtini" (not to be confused with the current Iraqi national anthem of the same name) was reintroduced on a provisional basis. That was replaced in 2004 by the new Iraqi government with a new national anthem, also called "Mawtini", which is currently in use today.

Lyrics

See also

List of historical national anthems

References

External links
"Ardulfurataini Watan" (in MP3 format)
"Ardulfurataini Watan" (in MIDI format)
"Ardulfurataini Watan" (in MIDI format)
Coldstream Guards performance

Asian anthems
Historical national anthems
History of the Ba'ath Party
Iraqi music
Modern history of Iraq
National symbols of Iraq
Songs about Iraq